Mburicaó  is a neighbourhood (barrio) of Asunción, Paraguay.

Neighbourhoods of Asunción